Lesbian, gay, bisexual, and transgender (LGBT) persons in  Nicaragua face legal challenges not experienced by non-LGBT residents. Both male and female same-sex sexual activity are legal in Nicaragua. Discrimination based on sexual orientation is banned in certain areas, including in employment and access to health services.

According to Nicaraguan LGBT group Movimiento de la Diversidad Sexual (Movement of Sexual Diversity), there are approximately 600,000 gay people living in Nicaragua.

Legality of same-sex sexual activity
Both male and female same-sex sexual activity have been legal in Nicaragua since March 2008. The age of consent is 16, regardless of sexual orientation or gender, and all sexual offenses are gender-neutral, according to articles 168, 170, 172 and 175 of the Criminal Code of Nicaragua.

Recognition of same-sex relationships

Same-sex couples and households headed by same-sex couples are not eligible for the same legal benefits and protections available to opposite-sex married couples.

In June 2014, the Nicaraguan Congress approved a revised family code that would limit marriage, partnerships and adoption to heterosexual couples. On 8 April 2015, the new Family Code went into effect. Several organizations filed an action of unconstitutionality against the Code.

Article 72 of the Constitution of Nicaragua states that:

On 9 January 2018, the Inter-American Court of Human Rights (IACHR) ruled that countries signatory to the American Convention on Human Rights are required to allow same-sex couples to marry. The ruling, which set binding precedent for numerous Latin American countries, states that:

Discrimination protections
Article 315 of the Penal Code on "offenses against labor rights", states that discrimination based on "sexual option", is punishable with up to one year in prison.

Article 3(l) of Law N° 820 for the Promotion, Protection and Defense of Human Rights in the face of HIV and AIDS, for its Prevention and Attention prohibits discrimination based on sexual orientation (among other grounds).
 
Article 1 of Ministerial Resolution 671-2014 prohibits discrimination based on sexual orientation, gender identity and gender expression in access to health services.

Hate crime law
According to Article 36(5) of the Penal Code, an aggravating circumstance exists when a person is motivated by discrimination based on sexual orientation while committing a criminal offense.

A 2012 survey by the Center for Justice and International Law found that 53 aggressions against LGBT people had occurred between 1999 and 2011. Of these, 15 involved murders (10 gay men, 4 transgender people and 1 lesbian). The actual number of homicides and violent attacks is expected to be higher, as many victims choose not to denounce the attacks to the police.

Social conditions
Gay men are generally more visible in public than lesbians are. When lesbians socialize with each other, it often happens in private residences or other private places.

LGBT history in Nicaragua
Many LGBT Nicaraguans held prominent roles during the Sandinista Revolution; however, LGBT rights were not a priority to the Sandinista Government because the majority of the population were Roman Catholic. Protecting those rights was also considered politically risky and bound to be met with hostility from the Roman Catholic Church, which already had bad relations with the government. On the tenth anniversary of the Sandinista Revolution (1989), many community centers were launched for LGBT people. The centers began to form after a march by activists that took place in Managua.

After the United States lifted the economic embargo against Nicaragua, many non-governmental organizations (NGOs) promoting LGBT rights began to operate in the country. As a result, Nicaragua hosted its first public gay pride festival in 1991. The annual Gay Pride celebration in Managua, held around 28 June, still occurs and is used to commemorate the uprising of the Stonewall riots in New York City.

After gaining support, the LGBT community suffered a setback when a bill formerly written to protect women from rape and sexual abuse was changed by social Christians in the National Assembly. The change imposed a sentence of up to three years in prison for "anyone who induces, promotes, propagandizes, or practices sex among persons of the same sex in a scandalous manner." It also included any unmarried sex acts. Activists and their allies protested in Nicaragua and at embassies abroad; however, President Violeta Chamorro signed the bill into a law in July 1992 as Article 204 of the Nicaragua Criminal Code.

In November 1992, a coalition known as the Campaign for Sexuality without Prejudices (Campaña por una Sexualidad sin Prejuicios), composed of lawyers, lesbians, and gay activists, among others, presented an appeal to the Supreme Court of Justice challenging the law as unconstitutional. The Supreme Court rejected the appeal in March 1994. On 1 March 2008, a new Penal Code took effect. It omitted the language in the now-repealed Article 204 and, by doing so, decriminalized sex out of wedlock and gay sex between consenting adults.

United Nations
Since legalizing homosexuality in 2008, Nicaragua has been active on the international level in supporting LGBT rights. In 2011, Nicaragua signed the "joint statement on ending acts of violence and related human rights violations based on sexual orientation and gender identity" at the United Nations, condemning violence and discrimination against LGBT people.

The Nicaraguan Government has also urged countries to repeal their sodomy bans, including Antigua and Barbuda.

Public opinion
According to a Pew Research Center survey, conducted between 9 November and 13 December 2013, 77% of Nicaraguans opposed same-sex marriage, 16% were in favor and 7% did not know.

The 2017 AmericasBarometer showed that 24.5% of Nicaraguans supported same-sex marriage.

Summary table

See also

LGBT rights in the Americas

Notes

References